The 2021 season is Santos FC's 109th season in existence and the club's sixty-second consecutive season in the top flight of Brazilian football. As well as the Campeonato Brasileiro, the club competes in the Copa do Brasil, Campeonato Paulista and the Copa Libertadores.

Players

Squad information

Source: SantosFC.com.br (for appearances and goals), Wikipedia players' articles (for international appearances and goals), FPF (for contracts). Players in italic were not registered for the Campeonato Paulista

Copa Libertadores squad

Source: Conmebol.com

Copa Sudamericana squad

Source: Conmebol.com

Appearances and goals

Last updated: 10 December 2021
Source: Match reports in Competitive matches, Soccerway

Goalscorers

Last updated: 10 December 2021
Source: Match reports in Competitive matches

Disciplinary record

As of 10 December 2021
Source: Match reports in Competitive matches
 = Number of bookings;  = Number of sending offs after a second yellow card;  = Number of sending offs by a direct red card.

Suspensions served

Managers

Transfers

Transfers in

Loans in

Transfers out

Loans out

Notes

Competitions

Overview

Campeonato Paulista

Results summary

Group stage

Matches

Copa Libertadores

Qualifying stages

Second stage

Third stage

Group stage

Copa Sudamericana

The draw for the final stage was held on 1 June 2021.

Round of 16

Quarter-finals

Campeonato Brasileiro

Results summary

Results by round

League table

Matches

Copa do Brasil

Third round

Round of 16

Quarter-finals

References

Notes

External links
Official Site 
Official YouTube Channel 

2021
Santos FC